Vidura Wickremanayake (born 11 July 1959) is a Sri Lankan politician. He is the current Minister of Buddhashasana, Religious, and Cultural Affairs and Member of Parliament. He is the son of the former Sri Lankan Prime Minister Ratnasiri Wickremanayake.

Early life and education
Born to Ratnasiri Wickremanayake and Kusum Wickremanayake, he was educated at Royal College, Colombo and gained a BSc in Agriculture in the Philippines.

Political career
Wickremanayake was elected to parliament from Kalutara from the Sri Lanka Freedom Party in the 2015 parliamentary election and was appointed State Minister of Agriculture. He was re-elected in the 2020 parliamentary election from the Kalutara electorate with 147,958 preferential votes and was appointed State Minister of National Heritage, Rural Arts. Following the mass resignation of the Sri Lankan cabinet in the wake of the 2022 Sri Lankan protests, he was appointed as the Minister of Labour by President Gotabaya Rajapaksa on 18 April 2022..He left office following the resignation of Prime Minister Mahinda Rajapaksa and thereby the whole government. He was appointed to the position of Minister of Buddhashasana, Religious, and Cultural Affairs in the new Sri Lankan Cabinet by President Gotabaya Rajapaksa on May 20th, 2022.

See also
List of political families in Sri Lanka

References

Members of the 14th Parliament of Sri Lanka
Members of the 15th Parliament of Sri Lanka
Members of the 16th Parliament of Sri Lanka
Sri Lanka Freedom Party politicians
United People's Freedom Alliance politicians
Living people
Sinhalese politicians
Alumni of Royal College, Colombo
1959 births